Kenny Per Anders Jönsson (born October 6, 1974) is a Swedish former professional ice hockey player.

Playing career
Jönsson was drafted by the Toronto Maple Leafs in the 1st round as the 12th overall selection in the 1993 NHL Entry Draft. After playing with the Toronto club during the 1994–95 lockout shortened season, he was traded midway through the 1995–96 season to the New York Islanders in a player exchange which brought highly popular former captain Wendel Clark back to Toronto. Jönsson then spent the remainder of his NHL career with the Islanders. After playing with the Swedish second division team Rögle BK, where he started his career, during the 2004–05 NHL lockout, he announced in the summer of 2005 that he was staying with the club for the 2005–06 season.

Jönsson played with the Islanders from 1996 through 2004. Fans and journalists considered Jönsson one of the most underrated defensemen in the league during his time in the NHL. He played good positional defense and had sound offensive skills as well, but his quiet demeanor and low-key playing style kept him below the radar of some observers.  During the 1999–2000 NHL season, Jönsson was named captain of the Islanders.  After a season and a half, he stepped down and ultimately was succeeded by Michael Peca.

He was voted Best Defender of the Tournament at the 2006 Winter Olympics where Sweden won the gold medal. This was quite surprising considering he had spent a season in the Swedish second division, while most of the other players played in the NHL.

His brother Jörgen is also a well-known Swedish ice hockey player; the two were briefly teammates in the 1999-2000 NHL season.

During IHWC 2006 World Championship, with brother Jörgen initially sidelined by injury, he was named captain of the Swedish national team.

Coaching career 
Prior to the 2010–11 season, Jönsson signed as an assistant coach of Rögle BK. However, after the end of the season, it was announced that he would leave Rögle as an assistant coach. Jönsson is currently assistant coach for Helsingborgs Hockey Club, educating the defense players.

Awards 
 Elitserien Rookie of the Year in 1993.
 Elitserien Junior of the Year in 1994.
 Junior World Championship's Best Defenceman in 1994.
 Named to the Junior World Championship All-Star Team in 1993 and 1994.
 Gold medal at the Winter Olympics in 1994 and 2006.
 Bronze medal at the World Championships in 1994 and 2009.
 Named to the NHL All-Rookie Team in 1995.
 Bronze medal at the World Cup of Hockey in 1996.
 Played in the NHL All-Star Game in 1999.
 Silver medal at the World Championship in 2004.
 Awarded Elitserien Guldpucken (Swedish Player of the Year) in 2006.
 Winter Olympic's Best Defenceman in 2006.
 Gold medal at the World Championship in 2006.
 Named to the World Championship All-Star Team in 2009.
 Member of New York Islanders Hall of Fame.

Career statistics

Regular season and playoffs

International

See also
Captain (ice hockey)
Notable families in the NHL

References

External links
 

1974 births
Living people
Ice hockey players at the 1994 Winter Olympics
Ice hockey players at the 2002 Winter Olympics
Ice hockey players at the 2006 Winter Olympics
Medalists at the 1994 Winter Olympics
Medalists at the 2006 Winter Olympics
National Hockey League first-round draft picks
New York Islanders players
Olympic ice hockey players of Sweden
Olympic gold medalists for Sweden
Olympic medalists in ice hockey
People from Ängelholm Municipality
Rögle BK players
St. John's Maple Leafs players
Swedish expatriate ice hockey players in Canada
Swedish expatriate ice hockey players in the United States
Swedish ice hockey defencemen
Toronto Maple Leafs draft picks
Toronto Maple Leafs players
Sportspeople from Skåne County